Merchandise Mart is a station on the Chicago Transit Authority's 'L' system, located in the Near North Side neighborhood at 350 North Wells Street in Chicago, Illinois (directional coordinates 320 north, 200 west). The station is elevated above street level, on a steel structure. The turnstiles and customer assistant booth of the station are located on the second level of the Merchandise Mart itself. This is the main entrance to the station. 

There are two fare-card only, unattended entrances atop two long stairways accessed directly from Wells Street, just north of Kinzie Avenue. The station is constructed mostly of steel, with wooden platforms covered by a canopy most of their length. There are two side platforms both long enough to support eight-car trains, the longest possible on the CTA system. The southbound platform is just slightly below the level of the station entrance while an enclosed bridge over the tracks connects to the northbound platform on the opposite side. 

The station is fully accessible, resulting in a complicated elevator setup. The elevator on the southbound platform can lower from the entrance to the platform, as well as go up to the top of the bridge. Another elevator on the opposite side of the bridge lowers to the northbound platform.

History
The original station opened on December 5, 1930, and was rebuilt from 1987 to 1988. Until 1963 the station also served interurban trains of the North Shore Line. The primary purpose of the station is to serve the Merchandise Mart, one of the world's largest commercial buildings, although there are some galleries and restaurants nearby.

Service
Merchandise Mart serves the Brown Line, but Purple Line Express trains also stop at the station during weekday rush hours. Merchandise Mart was the only Brown Line station not scheduled to receive upgrades or renovation during the Brown Line Capacity Expansion Project. Because of its recent construction from 1987 to 1988, the station is ADA-compliant and is already of sufficient length to accommodate eight-car trains, thus no major renovation was needed during the project.

Bus connections
CTA
  37 Sedgwick (Weekdays only)
  125 Water Tower Express (Weekday rush hours only)

Notes and references

Notes

References

External links 

 Merchandise Mart at Chicago-'L'.org
 Train schedule (PDF) at CTA official site
Kinzie Street exit-only stairs from Google Maps Street View

CTA Brown Line stations
CTA Purple Line stations
Railway stations in the United States opened in 1930
Former North Shore Line stations